Aiginio, known before 1926 as Libanovo, is a town and a former municipality in Pieria regional unit, Greece. Since the 2011 local government reform it is part of the municipality Pydna-Kolindros, of which it is the seat and a municipal unit. The municipal unit has an area of 75.541 km2, the community 62.246 km2. The population of the municipal unit was 4,869 people and the population of the community was 4,345 people as of 2011.

Transport
Aiginio is served by a railway station, which is served by Proastiakos.

Municipal unit
The municipal unit of Aiginio consists of the settlements of Aiginio (population 4,153), Megali Gefyra (population 192) and Katachas (population 524). Aiginio and Megali Gefyra constitute the community of Aiginio while Katachas is the other community of the municipal unit.

Sporting teams
Aiginio hosts the sport clubs Aiginiakos F.C., football club that have played in third national division and the volleyball club Niki Aiginiou that plays in A1 Ethniki Volleyball (first level).

References

External links
Αιγίνιο Community 
Municipality of Aiginio 

Populated places in Pieria (regional unit)

bg:Пидна-Колиндрос